The Seattle Great Wheel is a 53-meter tall giant Ferris wheel at Pier 57 on Elliott Bay in Seattle, Washington.

Opening day
The inauguration ceremony and opening to the public took place on June 29, 2012. Participants in the ceremony, which commenced at 2:30 p.m., included the U.S. Coast Guard with a presentation of colors, Seattle mayor Michael McGinn who delivered a speech, and the University of Washington cheerleaders, spirit team, and marching band who provided entertainment. Approximately 200 people lined up for the first ride on the wheel.

Construction and design

The Seattle wheel is the only one of the three to be built over water.

The Seattle Great Wheel has 42 climate-controlled gondolas, each able to carry up to eight passengers (except the luxury VIP gondola, which had red leather seats and a glass floor, and seats four), giving a maximum capacity of 332. The 12-minute, three-revolution ride extends  out over Elliott Bay.

In popular culture 

 The Seattle Great Wheel was featured in the climax for the film Death Note.
 The Seattle Great Wheel is a prominent landmark in the 2020 action-adventure game The Last of Us Part II.

References

External links 

 

2012 establishments in Washington (state)
Amusement rides introduced in 2012
Buildings and structures in Seattle
Central Waterfront, Seattle
Ferris wheels in the United States
Tourist attractions in Seattle